MBC 2, formerly called Channel 2, is a free-to-air movie channel owned by MBC Group. In its beginnings, it was broadcasting films and TV programs subtitled in Arabic, but after the launch of MBC 4, the channel became specialized in films only.

The channel mostly broadcasts American Hollywood movies but it also seldom features British, Canadian, French, Indian,  Chinese and other foreign films. MBC 2 has managed to negotiate long-term deals with the top Hollywood studios, securing first-run right and ensuring a steady flow of the top box-office movies. 
The channel largely targets the Arabic audience, especially young adults, having an important popularity among Arab viewers.

On 1 July 2011, MBC 2 HD was launched.

Programming

Shows 
 Action Zone
 Comedy Movies
 Celebrity Scoop
 Celebrity Scrapbook
 Celebrity Style Story
 Chat The Planet
 Films & Stars
 Hollywood Buzz
 Making the Movies
 Must Haves
 Planet Action
 Raya With The Stars
 Sawalef Hollywood
 Scoop
 Scoop Box Office
 Scoop Network
 Scoop On Set
 Scoop with Raya

Entertainment 
 Box Office America
 The Insider
 Young Hollywood's Greatest…
 Young Hollywood Presents: Evolution of…

Soap operas 
 The Bold and the Beautiful
 Days of Our Lives

Talk shows 
 The Oprah Winfrey Show

Sitcoms 
 The Bernie Mac Show
 Frasier
 Friends
 Full House
 Mad About You
 Sabrina, the Teenage Witch
 Saved by the Bell
 Seinfeld
 Two Guys and a Girl

Drama 
 24
 Ally McBeal
 Angel
 Boston Public
 Buffy The Vampire Slayer
 Charmed
 Crossing Jordan
 Close to Home
 Dark Angel
 The Dead Zone
 ER
 Family Law
 The Guardian
 Ghost Whisperer
 Ghost Whisperers
 Hercules: The Legendary Journeys
 Martial Law
 Strong Medicine
 Stargate SG-1
 Sue Thomas: F.B.Eye
 True Detective
 The X-Files

Reality 
 The Swan

Miniseries 
 The Night Manager
 Quiz

Children's series 
 The Pink Panther (dubbed in Arabic)

Special events 
 Academy Awards

Films 
 Baby's Day Out
 Beautiful Creatures
 Big Hero 6
 Brave
 Danny Collins
 Despicable Me
 Despicable Me 2
 Despicable Me 3
 Django Unchained
 Furry Vengeance
 The Hangover
 The Hangover Part II
 The Hangover Part III
 Home Alone
 Home Alone 2: Lost in New York
 Hotel Transylvania
 Ice Age
 Ice Age 2: The Meltdown
 Ice Age 3: Dawn of the Dinosaurs
 Ice Age 4: Continental Drift
 Ice Age 5: Collision Course
 Inside Out
 The Lion King
 Madagascar
 Madagascar: Escape 2 Africa
 Madagascar 3: Europe's Most Wanted
 Minions
 Mr. Holmes
 Penguins of Madagascar
 Pitch Perfect
 The Polar Express
 Ralph Breaks the Internet
 Storks
 Totally Spies! The Movie
 Wild Things
 Wreck-It Ralph
 Zootopia

Film blocks 
 Big Family Night : Wednesdays 7 p.m. KSA / 6 p.m. CLT
 Chiller Night : Thursdays 1 a.m. KSA / 12 a.m. CLT
 Friday Mega Movie : Fridays 9 p.m. KSA / 8 p.m. CLT
 Monday Night Premiere : Mondays 11 p.m. KSA / 10 p.m. CLT
 Screaming Sunday : Sundays 1:30 a.m. KSA / 12:30 a.m. CLT
 Star of the Month : Tuesdays 11 p.m. KSA / 10 p.m. CLT
 Star of the Month : Thursdays 11 p.m. KSA / 10 p.m. CLT
 Superhero Movie : Fridays 11 p.m. KSA / 10 p.m. CLT

See also
 MBC Group
 MBC Action
 MBC1 (Middle East and North Africa)
 MBC 4 (Middle East and North Africa)

External links

Free-to-air
Television channels and stations established in 2003
Movie channels
Arab mass media
Middle East Broadcasting Center